The Ascent is the debut studio album by American post-hardcore band Secrets released on January 17, 2012, through Velocity and Rise Records. The album debuted at number 3 on the Billboard Heatseekers chart, as well as the Billboard 200 at number 185. It is the only release to include original vocalist Xander Bourgeois before his departure in 2013.

Background
Shortly after being signed to Velocity/Rise the band began working with ex-A Day to Remember lead guitarist Tom Denney for their debut album. In an interview with Rock Edition singer Richard Rogers noted that they had originally intended to release a 5 to 6 song EP. The record label suggested that they instead release a full-length album, and brought in Denney to assist. In order to afford the recording of this album, Secrets camped in a tent in a car park for 1 whole month.

Release and promotion
The first single was "The Heartless Part", released November 22, 2011. The band then released several music videos over the next year for "The Oath", "Blindside", and "Somewhere in Hiding". The band toured extensively after the release to promote the album. They were on the entire 2012 Scream It Like You Mean It Tour, with label mates Hands Like Houses and In Fear and Faith.  They also supported Escape the Fate on their This World Is Ours tour in 2012. They also toured as supporting acts for fellow Rise artists Sleeping with Sirens, Abandon All Ships and Conditions. Prior to this, they toured with Jamie's Elsewhere and Oh, Sleeper.

Reception

The album was met with mostly mixed reviews. Grace Duffy of Under the Gun wrote that "There is a consistent air of indecision to The Ascent that costs it a few points, as its frequent shapeshifting doesn’t always flatter the end result. It is nonetheless a hearty and ambitious effort and a compelling listen, strikingly good at best and entertaining even at worst." Other reviewers noted that while the overall sound was quite catchy and had unique vocals, that the lyrics were somewhat generic and lacking in creativity.

Track listing

Personnel
Secrets
 Xander Bourgeois – unclean vocals
 Richard Rogers – rhythm guitar, clean vocals
 Michael Sherman – lead guitar
 Marc Koch – bass guitar
 Joe English – drums

Production
 Tom Denney – engineer, mixing, producer
 Billy Candler - Management
 Will Putney - Mastering
 Glenn Thomas - Artwork

Charts

References

2012 debut albums
Rise Records albums
Secrets (post-hardcore band) albums
Albums produced by Tom Denney